Sar Galan (also Romanized as Sar Galān; also known as Sarkalūn) is a village in Soleyman Rural District, Soleyman District, Zaveh County, Razavi Khorasan Province, Iran. At the 2006 census, its population was 484, in 108 families.

References 

Populated places in Zaveh County